Gulella ludwigi is a species of very small aerobic land snail, a terrestrial pulmonate gastropod mollusk in the family Streptaxidae. This species is endemic to Tanzania.

References

Fauna of Tanzania
Gulella
Taxonomy articles created by Polbot